Eupoca bifascialis is a moth in the family Crambidae. It is found from southern Mexico to north-central Argentina.

References

Moths described in 1863
Glaphyriinae